Francis Hamilton "Fran" Striker (August 19, 1903 – September 4, 1962) was an American writer for radio and comics, best known for creating the characters the Lone Ranger, the Green Hornet, and Sgt. Preston of the Yukon.

Early life
Born in Buffalo, New York, Striker attended Lafayette High School and the University of Buffalo, where he was a member of the Theta Chi fraternity. He dropped out of college, first serving a brief stint in New York City with an amateur theatrical company. Returning to Buffalo, he joined the staff of radio station WEBR (now WDCZ), working as an announcer. In 1929, he moved to WTAM in Cleveland, Ohio, where he served as announcer and continuity writer and wrote his first radio drama script, a biography of Stephen Foster. Lured back to WEBR as station manager, Striker wrote material ranging from skits to half-hour mysteries and Western scripts.

Striker soon drifted to freelancing, creating and writing his own series and selling them to stations across the United States. He began a long association with station owner George W. Trendle and radio station WXYZ in Detroit, which was trying to make a name for itself as a producer of radio drama, creating and writing the early series Thrills of the Secret Service, Dr. Fang, and Warner Lester, Manhunter (which introduced Mike Axford, later a supporting character on The Green Hornet).

The Lone Ranger
Late in 1932, Striker began working on The Lone Ranger; his earliest scripts were largely reworked from his earlier series Covered Wagon Days. A letter from Trendle dated Monday, January 30, 1933, clearly gives Striker credit for creating the character. However, by 1934 Striker was pressured by Trendle to sign over his rights to the Lone Ranger, and Trendle claimed credit as the creator. This sparked a long-term controversy over the creation of The Lone Ranger, extending as far as a 1960 television appearance by Striker on To Tell the Truth, which mentioned his role in the character's creation.

The actual first trial episodes of The Lone Ranger were broadcast on WEBR in Buffalo prior to the official premiere on WXYZ. These first broadcasts starred Buffalo actor John L. Barrett weeks before George Stenius (who later changed his name to George Seaton and became a film director) played the role. When the Lone Ranger series began to gain popularity, Trendle convinced Striker to move to WXYZ, where he eventually became head of WXYZ's script department. In Detroit, James Lipton portrayed the Lone Ranger's nephew, Dan Reid, during the early 1940s.

Striker was extremely prolific. In addition to writing 156 Lone Ranger scripts a year, he wrote The Green Hornet (built around the Lone Ranger's descendant, Britt Reid) and a short-lived series, Ned Jordan Secret Agent. He scripted various Lone Ranger novels, two movie serials, and The Lone Ranger comic strip. He also contributed scripts to Challenge of the Yukon (later adapted for television as Sergeant Preston of the Yukon). Striker's work as a comic strip writer extended to writing The Green Hornet comic books and the 1945 newspaper strip The Sea Hound (based on The Adventures of the Sea Hound radio series that Striker contributed scripts to).  He was also the author of the popular boy's adventure novels featuring "Tom Quest."

Striker's later work included stints on the television versions of The Lone Ranger and Sergeant Preston of the Yukon, which were initially being produced while the radio series were still on the air. He provided the stories for many TV episodes by reworking old scripts from the radio series. Other writers adapted the stories for television and were credited as the "scriptwriter." Striker's credit was given as "From the radio program edited by Fran Striker."

Striker was 59 when he died in a 1962 car accident in Elma, while moving with his wife and children. His final work was a historical novel, One More River, published posthumously. Fran was interred at Arcade Rural Cemetery in Arcade. His papers are in the archives of the University at Buffalo.

The characters Lucas Striker and Amy Striker in the 1981 film The Legend of the Lone Ranger were named in honor of Fran Striker. He was posthumously inducted into the Buffalo Broadcasting Hall of Fame in 1998.

References

Sources
 Bisco, Jim. Buffalo's Lone Ranger: The Prolific Fran Striker Wrote the Book on Early Radio. Western New York Heritage, Vol. 7, No. 4, Winter 2005.
 Dunning, John. On the Air: The Encyclopedia of Old-Time Radio. New York: Oxford University Press, 1998. 
 Grams, Martin, The Green Hornet: A History of Radio, Motion Pictures, Comics and Television, OTR Publishing, 2010.
 Harmon, Jim, The Great Radio Heroes, Doubleday, 1967.
 Osgood, Dick. Wyxie Wonderland: An Unauthorized 50-Year Diary of WXYZ Detroit. Ohio: Bowling Green University Press, 1981.

External links

 
 
 
 
 
 

1903 births
1962 deaths
20th-century American writers
American male writers
American radio writers
Green Hornet
Lone Ranger
Road incident deaths in New York (state)
University at Buffalo alumni
Writers from Buffalo, New York
Lafayette High School (Buffalo, New York) alumni